Ten ships of the French Navy have borne the name Éveillé ("awakened"):

Ships named Éveillé 
 , a 20-gun ship of the line  
 , a 24-gun ship of the line 
 , a fireship 
 , a 32-gun ship of the line 
 , a 64-gun ship of the line 
 , an Artésien-class ship of the line 
 , a Hasard class brig-aviso 
 , a gunbrig 
 , an Agile-class minesweeper 

Notes and references
Notes

References

Bibliography
 
 

French Navy ship names